The David W. Taylor Medal is a medal presented by the Society of Naval Architects and Marine Engineers for "notable achievement in naval architecture and/or marine engineering."

The medal was named in honor of Rear Admiral David W. Taylor, USN. It is gold-plated bronze approximately 2.5 inches (6.25 cm) in diameter. One side portrays Admiral Taylor; the other contains an inscription.

Although named for the same person, the medal should not be confused with the David W. Taylor Award presented by the United States Navy for contributions to the development of future maritime systems.

Recipients
Source: SNAME
 1936 David Watson Taylor
 1938 William Le Roy Emmet
 1939 Hugo P. Frear
 1940 John F. Metten
 1942 Samuel M. Robinson
 1943 William Hovgaard
 1945 Edward L. Cochrane
 1946 William Francis Gibbs
 1947 David Arnott
 1948 Earle W. Mills
 1949 George G. Sharp
 1950 Harold E. Saunders
 1951 C. Richard Waller
 1953 John E. Burkhardt
 1954 Edwin L. Stewart
 1955 Kenneth S.M. Davidson
 1956 Andrew I. McKee
 1957 David P. Brown
 1958 John C. Niedermair
 1959 Olin J. Stephens, II
 1960 Glenn B. Warren
 1961 Mark L. Ireland, Jr.
 1962 Charles D. Wheelock
 1963 Arthur D. Gatewood
 1964 Henry A. Schade
 1965 John P. Comstock
 1966 Richard B. Couch
 1967 Wilson D. Leggett, Jr.
 1968 Matthew G. Forrest
 1969 Douglas C. MacMillan
 1970 Ludwig C. Hoffmann
 1971 Phillip Eisenberg
 1972 John R. Kane
 1973 Jerome L. Goldman
 1974 Roger E.M. Brard
 1975 James B. Robertson, Jr.
 1976 Henry Benford
 1977 James J. Henry
 1978 John J. Nachtsheim
 1979 Philip F. Spaulding
 1980 Peter M. Palermo
 1981 Erwin Carl Rohde
 1982 Jacques B. Hadler
 1983 Jens T. Holm
 1984 Jan D. Van Manen
 1985 J. Randolph Paulling, Jr.
 1986 Robert N. Herbert
 1987 John B. Caldwell
 1988 Lawrence R. Glosten
 1989 Clark Graham
 1990 Lorenzo Spinelli
 1991 Douglas Faulkner
 1992 Justin E. Kerwin
 1993 Harry A. Jackson
 1994 Robert P. Giblon
 1995 John W. Boylston
 1996 Roy L. Harrington
 1997 George R. Knight, Jr.
 1998 Thomas S. Winslow
 1999 Robert J. Scott
 2000 Thomas G. Lang
 2001 Peter A. Gale
 2002 R. Keith Michel
 2003 Robert G. Keane, Jr.
 2004 Donald Liu
 2005 Robert G. Allan
 2006 Edward N. Comstock
 2009 Joseph P. Fischer
 2010 Peter Tang-Jensen
 2012 Kirsi Tikka 
 2013 Jeom Kee Paik 
 2014 Howard Fireman 
 2017 John C. Daidola 
2018 Frederick Stern
2019 Jeffrey J. Hough

See also
 List of engineering awards
 Prizes named after people

References

External links
 David W. Taylor Medalists

Naval architecture
Marine engineering awards